Ely Allen (born June 12, 1986 in Anchorage, Alaska) is an American soccer player.

Career

Youth 
Allen grew up in Kent, Washington, attended Kentridge High School.  He played youth soccer for Emerald City Football Club in Seattle, Washington.

College
Allen played college soccer at the University of Washington from 2004 to 2007.

Professional
Allen was the 21st overall pick in the 2008 MLS SuperDraft, selected by the Los Angeles Galaxy. During Galaxy's pre-season, in only his second professional appearance, Allen scored a goal (assisted by David Beckham) against Sydney FC in the Pan-Pacific Championship on February 23, 2008.

Allen made his MLS debut in the Galaxy's first match of the 2008 season against the Colorado Rapids on March 29, 2008. He scored his first MLS goal on June 7, 2008, also against the Colorado Rapids. On February 25, 2009, Allen was waived by the Galaxy due to frequent injury.

Following an unsuccessful trial with MLS expansion side Seattle Sounders FC due to illness, and having been unable to secure a professional contract elsewhere, Allen joined the Seattle Wolves of the USL Premier Development League on May 6, 2009. He went on to score 6 goals and contribute 6 assists in the 16 games he played for them.

On July 24, 2009, D.C. United announced it had signed Allen. He made his United debut in a friendly against Real Madrid on August 9, 2009, and made a couple of appearances for the team in the CONCACAF Champions League, but did not feature in league play, and was waived at the end of the season.

On March 31, 2010, Allen was signed as a player for the newly formed club NSC Minnesota Stars.
As of March 14, 2012, the Stars announced that Allen had been released from the team for unspecified reasons.

References

External links
 Washington Huskies profile
 UW soccer star’s road to the MLS

1986 births
Living people
American soccer players
Soccer players from Alaska
Association football midfielders
Washington Huskies men's soccer players
University of Washington alumni
Sportspeople from Anchorage, Alaska
LA Galaxy players
Washington Crossfire players
D.C. United players
Minnesota United FC (2010–2016) players
Major League Soccer players
USL League Two players
USSF Division 2 Professional League players
North American Soccer League players
LA Galaxy draft picks
United States men's youth international soccer players